Ivan Vasilyevich Larin (7 January 1926 – 1 November 1986) was a Soviet and Russian football player and coach. He died in November 1986 at the age of 60.

References

External links
 Profile by footballfacts.ru

1926 births
1986 deaths
CSKA Pamir Dushanbe managers
FC Elista managers
FC Spartak Vladikavkaz managers
Soviet football managers
Soviet footballers

Association footballers not categorized by position